The Indian locomotive class WDM-2 is a class of diesel-electric locomotive that was developed in 1962 by American Locomotive Company (ALCO) for Indian Railways. The model name stands for broad gauge (W), Diesel (D), Mixed traffic (M) engine, 2nd generation (2). They entered service in 1962. A total of more than 2,700 WDM-2 was built at ALCO and Banaras Locomotive Works (BLW or DLW, as it was formerly Diesel Locomotive Works), Varanasi between 1962 and 1998, which made them the most numerous class of mainline diesel locomotive until its successor the WDM-3A.

The WDM-2 is one of the most successful locomotives of Indian Railways serving both passenger and freight trains for over 60 years. A few WDM-2 units were exported to neighbouring countries like Sri Lanka and Bangladesh. Despite the introduction of more modern types of locomotives like WDG-4 and electrification, a significant number are still in use, both in mainline and departmental duties. As of April 2022, 10 locomotives still retain "operational status" on the mainline as WDM-2, with further examples in service as WDM-3A or WDM-2S.

Origin 
The history of WDM-2 begins in the early 1960s with the stated aim of the Indian Railways to remove steam locomotives from Indian Rails after recommendation of Karnail Singh Fuel Committee. Therefore, required building a large number of Co-Co diesel locomotives producing at least 2,600 hp (1,900 kW) with road switcher cabs to achieve this aim. Thus Indian Railways began looking at various diesel-electric designs.

Initially, the Indian railways invited tenders to build locomotives to the new specification. The following responses were received:

 ALCO submitted their model (RSD29 / DL560C) with 2,600 hp, 16-cylinder, 4-stroke turbo-supercharged engine with Co-Co bogies.
 General Motors Electro-Motive Division (EMD) submitted their G16, turbocharged to become the GT16. They had Co-Co bogies with 16-cylinder 2-stroke turbo-supercharged engines.

Each company submitted their prototypes and Indian Railways designated these prototypes as the WDM-2 class and WDM-4 class respectively. Technologically the General Motors WDM-4 was superior to ALCO WDM-2, but Indian Railways required a transfer of technology agreement that would allow these locomotives to be indigenously manufactured in India. Since General Motors did not agree to the transfer of technology agreement, the ALCO prototype was selected for production.

However, even before the arrival of WDM-2, another type of diesel locomotive was imported from ALCO in 1957. This locomotive was classified as WDM-1. However WDM-1s were not selected for mass production because of having only one forward cab at one end which needed a lot of turntables.

Production History 
The first few prototype WDM-2 locomotives were imported, with locomotive number 18040 being assigned the first WDM-2 of India. The need for a large number of locomotives quickly was deemed paramount. After Banaras Locomotive Works (DLW) completed construction of its factory in Varanasi, production of the locomotives began in India. The first 12 locomotives were built using kits imported from ALCO (order no. D3389) in the United States.

The first diesel loco assembled in DLW was locomotive number 18233 and the first fully-built WDM-2 from DLW was 18299. After that DLW started manufacturing WDM-2 locomotives from their own components. Since then over 2,800 locomotives have been manufactured with 16887 being the last locomotive in the series.

Although ALCO went bankrupt, DLW Varanasi successfully adapted the technology and produced many upgraded versions which were exported to many Broad Gauge countries. Later a number of modifications were made and a few sub-classes were created. These include WDM-2A, WDM-2B and WDM-3A (formerly WDM-2C). A few WDM-2 locomotives had been rebuilt by Diesel Loco Modernisation Works (DLMW) in Patiala, Punjab. These are fitted with DBRs produced by Daulat Ram Engineering.

Service History 
The whole batch of WDM-2 imports went all to the Diesel locomotive shed at Katni (KTE). Locomotive number 18040 was first loco in the series, but 18042 was the first WDM-2 unit to be commissioned. By 1967 the first express trains were being hauled by the WDM-2 instead of steam locomotives. Trains like the Himgiri express and Tamil Nadu express were hauled entirely by WDM-2 units. One of the most important express trains hauled by the WDM-2 class was the Mumbai Rajdhani express. By the 1980s the WDM-2 class was hauling most of the passenger and freight trains in India.

Maintenance 
The WDM-2 has a maintenance schedule of 3,000 km or 10 days, which was recommended by ALCO. These have been extended by 20 days to 30 days by using better and more efficient lubrication oils and other component fluids and improving some bearings for the suspension. The original WDM-2 bearings were very failure-prone and often required minor repairs. However the WDM-2 was very easy to operate and maintain because of its simple construction and mechanics which resulted in it being very reliable. This maintenance is usually done at the nearest Diesel loco shed.

Variants

WDM-3A 
The WDM-3A class is actually an upgraded WDM-2 designed to produce more power (3,100 hp instead of 2,600 hp) and increased reliability (roller bearings instead of conventional ALCO bearings). Except for 150 units, these are rebuilt WDM-2s. Rebuilt WDM-3As can be identified by an “R” at the end of their road number.

WDG-2/3A 
It is the dedicated freighter version of the WDM-2 and shares the same engine and horsepower rating with WDM-3A.The first units of this class was delivered on 18 July 1995 under the model name of WDG-2. The class was manufactured till the end of 2015. All the older locomotives built by DLW had a regular WDM-2 type square short hood profile and control stand position. The Bogies of WDM-2 have been replaced by high adhesion fabricated bogies for better traction and stability.

They are hugely successful; around 1163 units of this class were produced. These can be found all over India performing various duties like hauling freight and passenger service to shunting and departmental works.

WDM-7 
They are lower powered (2,000 hp instead of 2,600 hp) version of the WDM-2. These locomotives were built from 1987 to 1989. A few were at Ernakulam, but all were transferred later to Tondiarpet. They can also be seen shunting at Chennai Central or used for light passenger haulage. Some are at the thermal power station, Chennai.

They were formerly housed at Erode and Golden Rock. They are reliable and rugged locomotives even though low powered. They can be easily recognised by the lack of grilles on the short hood. Two locomotives are running on a mixture of bio-diesel and diesel. All 15 are still in service.

WDP-1 
It is a lower powered passenger (2,300 hp) version of the WDM-2. The Bogies of WDM-2 have been replaced by Bo-Bo fabricated bogies with a max. speed of 140 km/h. They were not hugely successful. About 69 units have been produced with 60 locomotives still being in service. They are identifiable by their ‘baldie’ grille-less short hoods.

Sub-classes

WDM-2A 
The WDM-2A is a variant of the original WDM-2 series that have been retro-fitted with air brakes, in addition to the original vacuum brakes. Thus, these locomotives can haul both vacuum- and air-braked wagons. Air brakes were introduced as they're safer and more reliable. Despite this classification some WDM-2A locomotives are still marked as WDM-2 rather than WDM-2A.

WDM-2B 
The WDM-2B is a variant of the original WDM-2 series built with air brakes as original equipment. They do not have vacuum brakes. Only some have been classified as WDM-2B.

Jumbos 

The WDM-2 locomotives from serial numbers around 17788 to 17890 were fitted with full-width short hoods with the intention of improving visibility for drivers. These are unofficially termed 'Jumbos' by crew and Rail-fans. WDM-2 #17722 and #17748 are rumored to be the prototypes of the jumbo class, but differ slightly from other Jumbos. However, these locomotives proved to be not so ergonomic since locomotive pilots observed that they had to stand up to operate them. So a few were modified to have normal short hoods. Some earlier Jumbo locomotives were also converted to WDM-3A.

These locomotives are easily recognisable by their short hoods with large windows. After over-ageing of these locomotives, the jumbos were mainly used on shunting or departmental works trains. All of them are now withdrawn from service and condemned.

WDM-2S 
This classification is given to WDM-2s that are nearing the end of their service life. These locomotives can be easily recognized by '0' at the beginning of their road number. These are relegated to shunting duties, and occasionally haul Departmental works trains.  Some WDM-2 units remain in classification for many years before they are scrapped.

Export versions

Sri Lanka 

Eight WDM-2 locomotives were purchased by the Sri Lanka Railways, the state-run railroad operator in Sri Lanka in 1996. They were the longest and most powerful locomotives at that time. They were allocated the M8 class. However, some modifications to the appearance were done by SLR. These locomotives have been assigned road numbers 841 to 848 and all are still operational.

Bangladesh

Ten WDM-2 locomotives were purchased by Bangladesh Railway in 2001. They were the most powerful locomotives at that time. They were allocated Class 6400 or BED-26 numbered from 6401 to 6410.  All are fitted with air brake and AAR coupling. Unlike their Indian counterparts, these locomotives do not have the dynamic braking system. All locomotives are still in service.

Loco Road numbers 
During the manufacture of WDM-2, DLW built and numbered these locomotives non-sequentially.

18040–079/18112–18232 series locomotives 
These locomotives were among the first WDM-2s used in India. Locomotive number 18040 is the first in the series to be imported; subsequent ones were later supplied by ALCO. Locomotives numbered from 18080 to 18111 are actually WDM-4 class. These WDM-2 locomotives can be easily identified by their original ALCO dynamic brake vents with three partitions. They were mostly in mainline service till 2007 and were relegated to shunting/departmental duties thereafter. The last of these locomotives (WDM-2 numbered 18068 from Kurla) were condemned by March 2014. All of these locomotives have been withdrawn from service and scrapped.

18232–18514 series locomotives 
After 18232, DLW started manufacturing locomotives from kits supplied by ALCO. The first kit-built from DLW was 18233 named 'Kundan'; subsequent ones were later assembled in DLW from kits supplied by ALCO after technology transfer took place. Some of these locomotives (like WDM-2 18236) have retained their original ALCO dynamic brake vents with three partitions. The first fully-built WDM-2 from DLW was 18299. These locomotives were mostly in mainline service till 2007, thereafter relegated to shunting/departmental duties like ALCO-built ones. The last of these locomotives (such as #18473) were condemned by November 2013.

After 18514, DLW started manufacturing '17' series locomotives.

17100–17999 / '17' series locomotives 
DLW stopped '18' series midway (18499) and started producing '17' series locomotives. Locomotives numbered from 17000 to 17099 are WDM-1 class. These were fully-built WDM-2 locomotives from DLW. The loco numbers 17796–17895 are the 'Jumbo' versions of WDM-2. Almost all of the WDM-2 Jumbos belong to this series. Most of these locomotives were manufactured in the 1970s. The '17' series locomotives are no longer used for mainline services; these are now fit only for shunting and inferior activities with most of them being condemned/scrapped.

18514–18522 are WDM-3 locomotives built by German Manufacturers Henschel.

18523–18900/18903–18999 series locomotives 
The locomotives numbering 18530 onward were manufactured from the early 1980s. Almost all locomotives were rebuilt to WDM-3A standards, but most were returned to WDM-2 standards as they reached the end of their service life. A few are still in mainline service as WDM-3As. Some of them are fit only for shunting and inferior activities with most of them being condemned/scrapped.

18901 and 18902 are WDM-6 locos — no longer in service.

16000–16887 / '16' series locomotives 
The '16' series is the youngest in the WDM-2 series. The oldest locomotive number 16001 was manufactured in the mid-1980s. They are originally WDM-2s and all were rebuilt to WDM-3A standards (except for locomotives lost to collision damage). All '16' series locomotives are still running in mainline duties as WDM-3A class. About 30 units remain as pure WDM-2s and still in service. Rapid scrapping of the '16' series has now begun.

Liveries 
 RTM : *1. Red top, Navy blue bottom and white band middle. - *2. Light Blue top, Navy blue bottom and white band middle. - 3. Typical Patiala Workshop livery dark blue top, bottom and white band middle. 
 TNP: Light and dark blue bottom. Flying bird on pink background was the logo. Few biodiesel ones were green.
 ERS: A Kerala-based logo with characteristic ICF Rajdhani livery.
 ED: Prancing deer of IR, dark blue with white.
 R: Light Blue Top and Bottom with White Band in middle.

 * = Forbidden

Preserved examples
A number of WDM-2 locomotives have been preserved all over India with some units still in service.

Locomotive sheds

Former sheds
 Andal (UDL)
 Bardhaman (BWN)
 Bokaro Steel City (BKSC)
 Bondamunda (BNDM)
 Deen Dayal Upadhaya (DDU)
 Ernakulam (ERS)- The very last WDM-2 (18701) was removed from service in June 2019 after being in the shed for 38 years.
 Erode (ED)
 Gonda (GD)
 Gooty (GY)
 Guntakal (GTL)
 Howrah (HWH)
 Itarsi (ET)
 Izzatnagar Loco Shed (IZN)
 Jhansi (JHS)
 Kalyan (KYN)
 Kazipet (KZJ)
 Kharagpur (KGP)
 Krishnarajapuram (KJM)
 Lucknow (LKO)
 Ludhiana (LDH)
 Moula Ali (MLY)
 Pune (PUNE)
 New Guwahati (NGC)
 Raipur (R)
 Loco Shed Patratu (PTRU)
 Ratlam (RTM)
 Samastipur (SPJ)
 Tughlakabad (TKD)
 Vatva (VTA)
 Visakhapatnam (VSKP)
Malda Town (MLDT)

Technical specifications

Image gallery

See also
 List of diesel locomotives of India
 Rail transport in India

References

Notes

Bibliography

M-2A
Co-Co locomotives
ALCO locomotives
Railway locomotives introduced in 1962
5 ft 6 in gauge locomotives